Hacıağalar (also, Hacağalar) is a village in the municipality of Qamqam in the Quba Rayon of Azerbaijan.

References

Populated places in Quba District (Azerbaijan)